The enzyme heparin-sulfate lyase catalyzes the chemical reaction

Elimination of sulfate; appears to act on linkages between N-acetyl-D-lucosamine and uronate. Product is an unsaturated sugar.

This enzyme belongs to the family of lyases, specifically those carbon-oxygen lyases acting on polysaccharides.  The systematic name of this enzyme class is heparin-sulfate lyase. Other names in common use include heparin-sulfate eliminase, heparitin-sulfate lyase, heparitinase I, and heparitinase II.

References

 

EC 4.2.2
Enzymes of unknown structure